Herv may refer to:

People
 Herv., the abbreviation for botanist author Alpheus Baker Hervey (1839–1931)
 Hervǫr (Herv), a skald (Scandinavian poet)
 Hervǫr Hundingjadóttir (HervH), a skald (Scandinavian poet)

Other uses
 Human endogenous retrovirus

See also